Venus nux is a species of saltwater clam. They are marine bivalve molluscs in the family Veneridae, sometimes known as the venus clams.

The shells are globular, with dense, concentric ribs on the surface.

The species is widespread in the Mediterranean Sea and the Atlantic littorals of Portugal and Spain.

References

Veneridae
Bivalves described in 1791
Taxa named by Johann Friedrich Gmelin